Vivian Kai Lokko (born 15 January) is a Ghanaian media personality, journalist and business anchor at Citi FM. She was claimed to be the only Ghanaian journalist that was nominated by the American Embassy in Washington to cover the hosting of about 50 African leaders by former US President Barack Obama. In 2013, she won the overall Business Journalist of the Year for radio in Ghana.

Early life and education 
Vivian was born on 16 January. She graduated with a BA in Political Science and Theater Arts from the University of Ghana. She further went to the Gordon Institute of Business Science in the University of Pretoria in South Africa. She holds a BA (Hons) in Political Science and Theatre Arts from University of Ghana

Career 
She is currently the Head of News at Citi TV where she anchors Citi News Room and Citi FM where she anchors Citi Business News. Vivian Kai Lokko is the Head of News at Citi TV and Citi FM. She leads a growing team of about 60 journalists including reporters based in every region in the country. She has responsibility for the station's news and current affairs wings. Vivian anchors the stations flagship daily news programmes – Citi News Room on TV and Citi Business News on Radio.

Awards and nominations 
She was nominated by American Embassy to cover the hosting of about 50 African leaders by US President Barack Obama in Washington.

In October 2014, she was also nominated to cover the Global African Investment Forum hosted by the Daily Mail and David Cameron.

In 2014, Vivian was nominated for the Radio Newscaster of the Year category during the 2014 Radio and Television Personality Awards.

Vivian has covered annual meetings of MultiChoice Africa, Standard Bank of South Africa and other meetings in Mauritius and South Africa.

She was awarded the 'Most Outstanding Female Media Personality' at the Feminine Ghana Achievement Awards in March 2018.

Personal life 
Vivian is married to Evans Nii Nortey Lokko in 2015.

Legacy 
It was during her leadership Citi FM won the Best Business Radio station in 2012 and 2013. She is claimed to be among 'Top 50 Ghanaian Journalists' by Avance Media.

References 

Living people
Ghanaian radio journalists
Ghanaian women journalists
University of Ghana alumni
Year of birth missing (living people)